Derek Popovich (born April 24, 1981 in Syracuse, New York, United States) is a midfielder who plays for American MISL side Syracuse Silver Knights.

Popovich grew up in Baldwinsville, New York.  He attended SUNY Oswego, playing on the men's soccer team from 1999 to 2002.  In 2002, he began his professional career with the Albany Blackwatch Highlanders in the fourth division Premier Development League.  In 2004, he moved to the Atlanta Silverbacks of the USL First Division.  He played only one game.  In 2005, he moved to the Wilmington Hammerheads of the USL Second Division.

References

External links
 Excellent overview of career

1981 births
Living people
Sportspeople from Syracuse, New York
American soccer players
Atlanta Silverbacks players
USL First Division players
USL Second Division players
Wilmington Hammerheads FC players
Albany BWP Highlanders players
USL League Two players
Soccer players from New York (state)
Association football midfielders
Syracuse Silver Knights players
State University of New York at Oswego alumni